Fred White is a New Zealand former rugby league footballer who represented New Zealand. New Zealand toured Australia that year however White did not play in any of the three test matches.

In 2008 he was named in the Taranaki Rugby League Team of the Century.

References

Living people
New Zealand rugby league players
New Zealand national rugby league team players
Taranaki rugby league team players
Rugby league wingers
Year of birth missing (living people)